Abdoulaye Bamba (born 25 April 1990) is an Ivorian professional footballer who plays as a right-back for Ligue 1 cub Angers SCO and the Ivory Coast national team.

Club career

Youth
Bamba began his career in Italy after moving to the country at a young age. He joined Legnago Salus at the age of ten and, after one season, joined Juventus. While in the club's youth academy, he played on youth teams that won the Supercoppa Primavera in 2007 and the Torneo di Viareggio in 2009.

Dijon
In July 2010, after spending nearly a decade with Juventus, Bamba signed his first professional contract after agreeing to a two-year deal with French club Dijon. He made his professional debut on 17 September 2010 in a league match against Évian playing the entire match in 5–1 victory. On 26 November, he assisted on the final goal in a 3–0 win over Châteauroux.

Angers
In January 2017, Bamba joined Angers SCO on a contract until June 2018.

International career
Bamba was born and raised in Ivory Coast. He made his debut for the Ivory Coast national football team in a friendly 0–0 tie with Hungary.

References

External links
 
 
 

Living people
1990 births
Footballers from Abidjan
Ivorian footballers
Association football defenders
Ivory Coast international footballers
Ligue 1 players
Ligue 2 players
Championnat National 2 players
Championnat National 3 players
Juventus F.C. players
Dijon FCO players
Angers SCO players
Ivorian expatriate footballers
Ivorian expatriate sportspeople in Italy
Expatriate footballers in Italy
Ivorian expatriate sportspeople in France
Expatriate footballers in France